State Highway 300 (SH 300) is a  state highway in Lake County, Colorado, United States, that connects the Leadville National Fish Hatchery with U.S. Route 24 (US 24) southeast of Leadville.

Route description

SH 300 begins at the Leadville National Fish Hatchery. The highway then runs east for the remaining  of its route, crossing the Arkansas River just before reaching its eastern terminus. SUH 300 ends at a T intersection with US 24, southeast of Leadville. (US 24 heads north to Leadville and south to Buena Vista.)

Major intersections

See also

 List of state highways in Colorado

References

External links

300
Transportation in Lake County, Colorado